Aspirator may refer to:
 Aspirator (medical device), a suction device used to remove bodily fluids from a patient
 Aspirator (pump), a device producing vacuum by the Venturi effect in a constricted stream of fluid
 Aspirator (entomology), also known as pooter, a suction device used to collect insects

See also
 Aspiration (disambiguation)